Aihui District, formerly known as Aihui, Aihun, Aihu, and Aihu, is an administrative district and the seat of the prefecture-level city of Heihe, Heilongjiang Province, China. It is located on the right (south-western) bank of the Amur River, across which is Blagoveshchensk, Amur Oblast, Russia.

Names 
Aihui has undergone a number of name changes throughout its history. Most recently, in 1956, the area's Chinese characters were changed from Aihui to the present Aihui, due to the uncommon nature of the former name's characters.

History

The area of present-day Aihui has been occupied on-and-off by various Chinese dynasties dating back to the Tang dynasty.

Qing dynasty 
To fend off military Russian military forces invading the area, Qing dynasty forces were stationed in present-day Aihui in 1683.

In 1685, the city of Aihui was built on orders from the Yamen of Heilongjiang. In the subsequent two centuries since its founding, Aihui served as one of the most important towns of Northern Manchuria.

Following the Boxer Rebellion the city was briefly occupied by Russia, until 1906, when it was returned to the Qing dynasty.

Republic of China 
In 1913, Aihui incorporated as Aihui County.

From December 1934 to 1945, the city was ruled by the Japanese puppet-state of Manchukuo.

On December 11, 1956, was renamed Aihui County (pronunciation unchanged). On November 15, 1980, Heihe City was created, and on June 6, 1983, Aihui County was abolished, being merged into the Heihe City.

To further complicate the situation, in 1993 the former Heihe City (a county-level administrative unit) was reorganized into Aihui District (also a county-level unit), while the former Heihe Prefecture became Heihe Prefecture-level City (which consists of Aihui District and a number of counties). This administrative division has been in effect ever since.

Geography 
The  and the  both run through the district. Much of the district is forested, particularly in the west. The primary trees of Aihui District are larch, red pine, poplar, and birch.

The district shares a  border with Russia, and faces the Russian city of Blagoveshchensk.

Administrative divisions
Aihui is divided into 4 subdistricts, 3 towns, 5 townships, 3 ethnic townships, and 23 other township-level divisions.

Subdistricts 

Towns 

Townships 

Ethnic townships 

Other township-level divisions 
The district also has 23 other township-level divisions, which include mines, farms, forestry areas, and other similar operations which have township-level status.

Demographics
About 18,500 persons (9.4% of the entire population) belong to ethnic minorites. Aihui is home to 26 different ethnic groups, including Han Chinese, Manchu, Hui, Daur, Oroqen, Korean, and Mongol populations.

As of the 1990s, the village of Dawujia, located in the district, remained one of the few pockets where the Manchu language was commonly spoken.

Economy 
The district is home to proven reserves of 69 different types of minerals. Provel coal reserves total 1.1 billion tons, proven gold reserves are 80 tons, proven silicon reserves are 1 million tons, and proven limestone reserves total 12 million tons. There are also sizable reserves of marble, basalt, perlite, and quartz sand.

Transportation 
National Highway 202 runs through the district, as does the Bei'an-Heihe railway.

References

County level divisions of Heilongjiang
Heihe